Conciliación is a barrio (neighbourhood or district) of Montevideo, Uruguay.

Places of worship
 Parish Church of St Vincent Pallotti (Roman Catholic, Pallottines)

See also 
Barrios of Montevideo

External links 

Barrios of Montevideo